Stepanović is a Serbian surname, derived from the male given name Stepan (Stephen). It may refer to:

 Bojan Stepanović, Serbian footballer
 Dragoslav Stepanović, Serbian football manager and former player
 Ognjeslav Kostović Stepanović, Serbian-Russian inventor
 Stepa Stepanović, Serbian field marshal

See also
 

Serbian surnames
Patronymic surnames
Surnames from given names